Pedrabranca Futebol Clube, also known as Pedrabranca, was a Brazilian football club based in Alvorada, Rio Grande do Sul state. The club was formerly known as RS Futebol Clube. They competed in the Série C once. Thiago Silva began his career there.

History
The club was founded on January 1, 2001 as RS Futebol Clube. They won the Campeonato Gaúcho Third Level in 2002. RS competed in the Série C in 2003, when the club was eliminated in the Fifth Stage by Ituano. RS Futebol Clube was  renamed or refounded to/as Pedrabranca Futebol Clube on August 8, 2008.

Achievements

 Campeonato Gaúcho Third Level:
 Winners (1): 2002

Season records
2003: Second Level, eliminated in 2nd Stage
2004: Second Level, eliminated in 2nd Stage
2005: Second Level, eliminated in 1st Stage

Stadium
Pedrabranca play their home games at Estádio Morada dos Quero-Queros. The stadium has a maximum capacity of 2,000 people.

References

Association football clubs established in 2001
Association football clubs established in 2008
Football clubs in Rio Grande do Sul
2001 establishments in Brazil
2008 establishments in Brazil